The fifth and final season of the HBO television series Boardwalk Empire premiered on September 7, 2014, and concluded on October 26, 2014, consisting of 8 episodes. The series was created by Terence Winter and based on the book Boardwalk Empire: The Birth, High Times and Corruption of Atlantic City by Nelson Johnson. Set in Atlantic City, New Jersey, during the Prohibition era, the series stars Steve Buscemi as Enoch "Nucky" Thompson (based loosely on the historical Enoch "Nucky" Johnson), a political figure who rose to prominence and controlled Atlantic City, New Jersey, during the Prohibition period of the 1920s and early 1930s. The fifth season takes place between April and October 1931, seven years after the previous season, during the Great Depression, with flashbacks to 1884 and 1897 detailing Nucky's childhood and young adulthood. On January 13, 2015, the fifth season was made available on DVD and Blu-ray in region 1.

Production
HBO renewed Boardwalk Empire for a fifth season on September 26, 2013, and announced on January 9, 2014, that it would be the final season. The New York budget for the show's final season was $87.2 million.

Cast and characters

Main cast
Departing the main cast from the previous season are Anthony Laciura, Jack Huston, Ron Livingston and Michael Stuhlbarg. Ben Rosenfield was promoted to main cast after recurring in the previous season.

 Steve Buscemi as Enoch "Nucky" Thompson
 Kelly Macdonald as Margaret Thompson
 Michael Shannon as Nelson Van Alden/George Mueller
 Shea Whigham as Elias "Eli" Thompson
 Stephen Graham as Al Capone
 Vincent Piazza as Charlie Luciano
 Michael Kenneth Williams as Albert "Chalky" White
 Paul Sparks as Mickey Doyle
 Jeffrey Wright as Dr. Valentin Narcisse
 Ben Rosenfield as Willie Thompson
 Gretchen Mol as Gillian Darmody

Recurring cast

Episodes

Reception
The fifth season of Boardwalk Empire received positive reviews from critics. On the review aggregator website Metacritic, the fifth season scored 83 out of 100 based on 12 reviews, indicating "universal acclaim".

For the 67th Writers Guild of America Awards, the series received two nominations for Best Episodic Drama—Howard Korder for "Devil You Know", and Riccardo DiLoreto, Cristine Chambers and Howard Korder for "Friendless Child". For the 21st Screen Actors Guild Awards, the cast was nominated for Best Drama Ensemble, Steve Buscemi was nominated for Best Drama Actor, and the series was nominated for Best Stunt Team.

For the 67th Primetime Emmy Awards, Tim Van Patten was nominated for Outstanding Directing for a Drama Series for "Eldorado". For the 67th Primetime Creative Arts Emmy Awards, the series received nine nominations, and won for Outstanding Cinematography for a Single-Camera Series and Outstanding Production Design for a Narrative Period Program (One Hour or More).

Broadcast 
The season premiered on OSN First HD in the Middle East on September 8, 2014.

References

External links 
 
 

Boardwalk Empire
2014 American television seasons
Fiction set in 1884
Fiction set in 1897
Fiction set in 1931